Hinkley Point B nuclear power station is a nuclear power station near Bridgwater, Somerset, on the Bristol Channel coast of south west England. It was the first commercial Advanced Gas Cooled reactor to generate power to the National Grid in 1976 and shares its design with sister station Hunterston B nuclear power station. It ceased operations permanently on 1 August 2022.

History

The construction of Hinkley Point B, which was undertaken by a consortium known as The Nuclear Power Group (TNPG), started in 1967. The reactors vessels were supplied by Whessoe, reactor machinery was supplied by Strachan & Henshaw and the turbines by GEC.

In March 1971, it was announced that there would be a six-month delay in completion due to problems with the insulation of the concrete pressure vessel. In place of the stainless steel mesh and foil insulation that had been used on previous Magnox stations, a fibrous type of insulation supplied by Delaney Gallay, part of the Lindustries Group, had been used for the first time. During pre-operational trials, before the nuclear fuel was loaded, high levels of acoustic vibration in the gas circuit were found to be damaging the insulation tiles, and the retention plates which held the insulation in place had to be redesigned and modified within the reactor.

During further pre-operational testing, severe vibration of the fuel channel gags was detected. The fuel channel gags are valves which are gradually closed to restrict the flow of gas through a fuel channel in order to maintain the channel gas outlet temperature as the nuclear fuel is used up. Modifications to produce a fluidically generated bias force to stop the gags vibrating took time to design, test and implement, delaying the planned start up date. The station began generating electricity on 5 February 1976.

It was taken over by Nuclear Electric as part of the privatisation of the UK Electricity Supply Industry in 1990, though remaining in public ownership at that time. In 1996, the AGR and PWR assets of Nuclear Electric and Scottish Nuclear were privatised as part of British Energy.

In 2006, the station's reactors were shut down in order to inspect the boilers for weld defects that had been found in power stations using similar boiler designs. Due to its age, on 16 August 2006 the company warned that until a decision was made over whether to extend its usable life it would operate at a maximum of 70 per cent load. Both reactors were subsequently restarted generating 420MW each, roughly 70% of full capacity.  The number 4 reactor was cleared for restart by the Nuclear Installations Inspectorate on 11 May 2007.

The power station's closure date was 2023 for a time, before it closed a year earlier.

In July 2013, EDF Energy announced that the load on both of the station reactors had been increased to 80 per cent, resulting in an output of around 485-500MWe per reactor up from 70% load, where it had been generating around 420MWe per reactor since 2006.

Hinkley Point B was the last of four nuclear power stations in the area to cease operations. Three Magnox power stations being decommissioned are the adjacent Hinkley Point A, and Oldbury nuclear power station and Berkeley nuclear power station on the banks of the River Severn.

In October 2016, it was announced that super-articulated control rods would be installed in the reactor because of concerns about the stability of the reactors' graphite cores. The Office for Nuclear Regulation (ONR) had raised concerns over the number of fractures in keyways that lock together the graphite bricks in the core.  An unusual event, such as an earthquake, might destabilise the graphite so that ordinary control rods that shut the reactor down could not be inserted. Super-articulated control rods should be insertable even into a destabilised core.

Specification
The station is of the advanced gas-cooled reactor (AGR) type with two 1,600MWt reactors, each with their own 660MWe steam turbine generator set giving a combined maximum design generating capacity of 1,250MW. , it provided over 1% of the UK's total power output.

Hinkley Point B is also equipped with four 17.5MW Rolls-Royce Olympus industrial gas turbines. Installed in 1970/71, and originally used for 'peak lopping', these are now used exclusively as emergency standby generators for the station.

Comparison with Hinkley Point A
A comparison with Hinkley Point A is shown below.
See also comparison of Hinkley Point A, B and C

Capacity and output 
The generating capacity, electricity output, load factor and thermal efficiency was as shown in the table.

Closure 
On 19 November 2020, EDF announced that Hinkley point B would stop generating electricity and move into the defuelling phase no later than 15 July 2022. 

The plant has operated for 45 years and produced over 300TWh over its lifetime. Reactor B-8 was shut down in July 2022, followed by reactor B-7 in August. EDF said that the defueling process could take a few years, and the removed fuel will be given to the Nuclear Decommissioning Authority for decommissioning.

Hinkley Point C 

A new 3,260MW Hinkley Point C nuclear power station, consisting of two EPR reactors, was given planning consent on 19 March 2013.
A guaranteed "strike price" of £92.50 per megawatt-hour (to be indexed for inflation over 45 years) was announced on 21 October 2013. The new power station would see Hinkley's contribution to the country's power supply rise to 7%. At the time of the planning consent, the price for electric energy on the wholesale market was around £45 per megawatt-hour while the new power plant was expected to need earnings of £90 per megawatt-hour in order to break even.

On 8 October 2014, the EU gave its consent to the 'Contract for Difference (CFD)' that guarantees the "strike price".

See also 

 Energy in the United Kingdom
 Energy policy of the United Kingdom
 James L. Gray

References 

Power stations in Somerset
Former nuclear power stations in England
Nuclear power stations using Advanced Gas-cooled Reactors